Qalat-e Bar Aftab (also Romanized as Qalāt-e Bar Āftāb) is a village in Sarrud-e Jonubi Rural District, in the Central District of Boyer-Ahmad County, Kohgiluyeh and Boyer-Ahmad Province, Iran. At the 2006 census, its population was 110, in 24 families.

References 

Populated places in Boyer-Ahmad County